The women's 400 metre freestyle S7 event at the 2012 Paralympic Games took place on 6 September, at the London Aquatics Centre.

Two heats were held, one with six swimmers and one with five swimmers. The swimmers with the eight fastest times advanced to the final.

Heats

Heat 1

Heat 2

Final

References

Swimming at the 2012 Summer Paralympics
2012 in women's swimming